Uriel Feige is an Israeli computer scientist who was a doctoral student of Adi Shamir.

Life
Uriel Feige currently holds the post of Professor at the Department of Computer Science and Applied Mathematics, the Weizmann Institute of Science, Rehovot in Israel.

Work
He is notable for co-inventing the Feige–Fiat–Shamir identification scheme along with Amos Fiat and Adi Shamir.

Honors and awards
He won the Gödel Prize in 2001 "for the PCP theorem and its applications to hardness of approximation".

References

Living people
Gödel Prize laureates
Theoretical computer scientists
Modern cryptographers
Public-key cryptographers
20th-century Israeli mathematicians
21st-century  Israeli mathematicians
Israeli computer scientists
Israeli cryptographers
Academic staff of Weizmann Institute of Science
Technion – Israel Institute of Technology alumni
Year of birth missing (living people)